Private Thomas Belcher (1834 – May 22, 1898) was an American soldier who fought in the American Civil War. Belcher was awarded the country's highest award for bravery during combat, the Medal of Honor, for his action during the Battle of Chaffin's Farm in Virginia on 29 September 1864. He was honored with the award on 6 April 1865.

Belcher died on 22 May 1898 and is believed to be buried in Togus, Maine.

Medal of Honor citation

See also

List of American Civil War Medal of Honor recipients: A–F

References

1834 births
1898 deaths
People of Maine in the American Civil War
Union Army soldiers
United States Army Medal of Honor recipients
American Civil War recipients of the Medal of Honor
People from Bangor, Maine